This article is a list of any town, village, hamlet and settlements in Scotland, that were cleared during the 18th and 19th centuries as part of the Highland Clearances. The Clearances were a complex series of events occurring over more than a hundred years.

Areas

 Assynt, Sutherland (1812)
 Strathnaver, Sutherland (1814-1819)

Villages

 Arichonan, Argyll
 Badbea, Caithness
 Loch Duntelchaig Invernesshire
 Peanmeanach, Lochaber
 Aoineadh Mòr (Inniemore), Morven
 Auliston, Morven
 Achanlochy, Sutherland
 Ceannabeinne, Sutherland
 Clyne, Sutherland, 1812
 Grummore, Sutherland
 Glencalvie, Sutherland
 Kildonan, Sutherland, 1812
 Lairg, Sutherland
 Poulouriscaig, Sutherland
 Rosal, Sutherland Sutherland
 Strathbrora, Sutherland
 Glenelg 1849
 Carnoch, Ross and Cromarty

Islands

 Berneray, North Uist.
 Riasg Buidhe, Isle of Colonsay
 Ormaig, Ulva Isle of Mull
 Crackaig, Isle of Mull
 Gualacholish, Isle of Mull
 Shiaba, Isle of Mull
 Hallaig, Isle of Raasay
 Screapadal, Isle of Raasay
 Stiomrabhaig, Isle of Lewis
 Boreraig, Isle of Skye
 Dalavil, Isle of Skye
 Lorgill, Isle of Skye
 Keppoch, Isle of Skye
 Suisnish, Isle of Skye
 Tusdale, Isle of Skye
 Fuaigh Mòr, Outer Hebrides
 Quandale, Rousay
 Westness, Rousay

References